Historical nihilism is a term used by the Chinese Communist Party (CCP) and some scholars in China to describe research, discussions, or viewpoints that contradict its official version of history in a manner perceived to question or challenge the legitimacy of the CCP. Viewpoints deemed to be historical nihilism are subject to censorship and legal repercussions. The CCP opposes historical interpretations that are critical of it, the People's Liberation Army, socialism, and related topics.

In a January 2013 speech, CCP general secretary Xi Jinping accused “hostile forces” of using historical nihilism to weaken the party's rule by smearing its history. In early 2021, Xi increased efforts to promote a “correct outlook on history” ahead of the 100th Anniversary of the Chinese Communist Party, including opening a telephone hotline and website for citizens to report instances of historical nihilism.

Background
Historical nihilism has been defined in CCP publications as criticism of the entirety of an entity, such as the CCP, its national heroes, leaders, socialism and its official history, by citing only certain events about the entity without consideration of the whole. Although 'incorrect' interpretations of history would have been censored and punished during the period of Mao Zedong (1949-1976) and Deng Xiaoping (1978-1989), neither leader made a clear attempt to engage against 'historical nihilism' as it is specifically understood today. According to Chinese historian Zhang Lifan, the main push to fight against 'historical nihilism', according to its specific modern meaning, undertaken by the CCP has its origin following the 1989 Tiananmen Square protests and massacre and coinciding events within the communist countries of Eastern Europe. In December of that year, Jiang Zemin made a speech in which he said the liberation of the bourgeoisie had led to the spread of 'national nihilism' and 'historical nihilism', which had entered party thinking and brought about confusion.

Historical nihilism is one of "The Seven Noteworthy Problems" discussed in the 2012 Communiqué on the Current State of the Ideological Sphere (Document No. 9). It states that the main expressions of historical nihilism are:

Government characterizations of historical nihilism
Media and education in China is not allowed to represent history in a manner that is forbidden by government censors. In 2018, the Law on the Protection of Heroes and Martyrs banned the slander of “heroes and martyrs”. In May 2021, the Cyberspace Administration of China confirmed it had deleted over 2 million posts containing 'harmful' discussions of history. The Chinese Academy of Social Sciences established a specialized unit to propagate an official version of history.

Topics on things like the Great Chinese Famine, the Cultural Revolution and 1989 Tiananmen Square protests and massacre are often scrubbed or at least depicted in such a way as to avoid blame on the party. Chinese students in public schools, for example, may be taught that the Great Famine was caused by bad weather conditions without mention of human factors related to contemporary government policy at the time. One of the textbooks in use for grade 10 history, in the part of the book dealing with the period, contains only a single sentence devoted to the famine that simply claims there were 'great economic difficulties for the people between 1959 and 1961'. Modern Chinese history is generally presented to praise the achievements of the CCP and its role in creating a prosperous 'new China'.

When Xi Jinping became CCP general secretary and paramount leader in January 2013, he made a speech in which he said, 'The history of the post-reform period cannot be used to contradict the history of the pre-reform period, and the history of the pre-reform period cannot be used to contradict the history of the post-reform period'. Although China's reforms since the 1980s caused it to radically change and abandon many of the Marxist policies that had existed under Mao Zedong, the official state-sanctioned version of history under Xi Jinping teaches an interpretation of continuity, praising both the contributions made by the CCP of Mao's generation and the CCP of the post-reform period. This is in contrast to interpretations in the period prior to Xi Jinping whereby some of Mao's policies could receive heavy criticism and the official stance of the party was a rejection of the Cultural Revolution, which had been referred to as the 'Ten Year Calamity' (十年浩劫).

Some critical events preceding the history of the CCP also may have interpretations that can be labeled as 'historical nihilism'. For example, in 1994 Li Zehou, a Chinese scholar, criticized Sun Yat-Sen and the Xinhai revolution of 1911, which marked the overthrow of the old Imperial system in China. His view was that the revolution was rooted in radicalism and had created a disaster, while it would have been better to slowly reform and modernize the system. This viewpoint was condemned as 'historical nihilism', because it was in contradiction to official CCP interpretations.

Collapse of the Soviet Union 
In a 2013 speech, Xi Jinping described historical nihilism as contributing to the collapse of the Soviet Union:

In February 2022, the CCP published the documentary Historical Nihilism and the Disintegration of the Soviet Union. The documentary argues that Nikita Khruschev "lit the fire of nihilism" by criticizing predecessor Joseph Stalin in his On the Cult of Personality and Its Consequences speech.

Ji Zhengju described the lesson that the CCP draws from historical nihilism in the Soviet Union as "weakening and abandonment of Party guidance in the ideological field serves the schemes of western powers to divide, westernize, and vilify the system, and leads to the proliferation of all kinds of erroneous thought tides."

Academic analysis 
Academics Jian Xu, Qian Gong, and Wen Yin write that the CCP's attention to historical nihilism "has gained momentum in the 21st century due to the rise of market-oriented cultural production in post-socialist China as well as the development of new media technologies." They cite the TV drama adaptation of "Red Classics" as "a pertinent example of historical nihilism caused by market orientation in cultural production," explaining:

Other uses of the term 
Some Chinese scholars accuse Western scholars who describe the Qing Dynasty as expansionist of engaging in historical nihilism. In the view of these Chinese scholars, Westerners are attempting to emphasize aggressive aspects of ancient China in order to demonstrate that today's China is inevitably aggressive.

Academic Roland Boer defines several genres of China-related narratives as historical nihilism, citing the "China doomer" narrative exemplified by Gordan H. Chang's The Coming Collapse of China (2001), anti-communist tropes, atrocity propaganda, and "betrayal" narratives in which Deng Xiaoping is cast as bringing capitalism to China.

See also 

 Ideology of the Chinese Communist Party
 Censorship in China

Citations

Ideology of the Chinese Communist Party
Censorship in China
Historiography of China
Historical revisionism
Nihilism